James Patrick Stuart is an American actor, currently portraying Valentin Cassadine on the daytime soap opera General Hospital, for which he received three consecutive Daytime Emmy Award nominations for Outstanding Supporting Actor in a Drama Series in 2020, 2021 and 2022.

Early life 
Stuart was born to English parents Chad and Jill Stuart. His father was one-half of the 1960s British Invasion duo Chad & Jeremy; because of this, Stuart spent much of his childhood in recording studios. As a child actor, he went by the name Patrick Stuart, and starred in the 1980s TV series Galactica 1980 as Doctor Zee.

Career 
Stuart played Confederate Colonel Edward Porter Alexander in the 1993 film Gettysburg and its 2003 prequel Gods and Generals. Between 1989 and 1992, he was the second actor (after Lonnie Quinn) to play Will Cortlandt on the daytime soap opera All My Children. He is known mostly for his work on television, appearing in such shows as CSI, Andy Richter Controls the Universe, The Closer, 90210, Still Standing, Seinfeld, Supernatural  and Frasier.

He provides the voices of Avalanche in Wolverine and the X-Men, Private the Penguin (replacing Christopher Knights) and Joey the Kangaroo in Nickelodeon's The Penguins of Madagascar, Pvt. MacGregor in Call of Duty 2 and Xigbar and Braig in the Kingdom Hearts video games.

He stars in the Disney Channel sitcom The Villains of Valley View, premiering June 3, 2022, as the mad scientist Kraniac.

Personal life 
Stuart resides in Los Angeles, California, with his wife, Jocelyn, and their two sons.

Filmography

Film

Television

Video games 
 Call of Duty 2 - Pvt. MacGregor
 Cars 2 - Nigel Gearsley
 Call of Duty: Black Ops - Additional voices
 Call of Duty: Modern Warfare 3 - Additional voices
 Call of Duty: Ghosts - Additional voices
 Diablo III - Additional voices
 Diablo III: Reaper of Souls - Additional voices
 Disney Infinity - Additional voices
 Disney Infinity 3.0 - Additional voices
 Epic Mickey 2: The Power of Two - Additional voices
 Ice Age: Dawn of the Dinosaurs - Buck
 Kinect Disneyland Adventures - Black Barty
 Kung Fu Panda 2 - Antelope
 Kingdom Hearts II - Xigbar
 Kingdom Hearts 358/2 Days - Xigbar
 Kingdom Hearts Birth by Sleep - Braig
 Kingdom Hearts 3D: Dream Drop Distance - Braig/Xigbar
 Kingdom Hearts HD 1.5 ReMIX - Xigbar
 Kingdom Hearts HD 2.5 ReMIX - Braig/Xigbar
 Kingdom Hearts HD 2.8 Final Chapter Prologue - Braig/Xigbar (archive audio)
 Kingdom Hearts III - Xigbar/Luxu
 The Amazing Spider-Man - Additional voices
 Toy Story 3: The Video Game - Additional voices

Awards and nominations

References

Sources

External links 

 
 

Living people
American male child actors
American male film actors
American male television actors
American male video game actors
American male voice actors
American people of English descent
Year of birth missing (living people)
20th-century American male actors
21st-century American male actors
Place of birth missing (living people)